Mary Bethune Park is a public park located in South Los Angeles, California. The park is located at 1244 East 61st Street, near the intersection of Central and Gage Avenues.  It is managed by the County of Los Angeles Department of Parks and Recreation.  The Newton Division of the Los Angeles Police Department is responsible for law enforcement in Bethune Park.

Bethune Park is named in honor of Mary Jane McLeod Bethune, who was an African-American political activist, education reformer, and advisor to President Franklin D. Roosevelt.

References

http://www.lacountyparks.org/Parkinfo.asp?URL=cms1_033389.asp&Title=Mary%20M.%20Bethune%20Park
https://web.archive.org/web/20110708131800/http://www.centerd.com/places/los-angeles-ca/bethune-park/detail/?id=495858680
http://www.eventective.com/USA/California/Los+Angeles/172107/Bethune-Park.html
https://maps.google.com/maps?hl=en&ie=UTF-8&q=bethune+park+los+angeles&fb=1&split=1&gl=us&cid=11307110637662775490&li=lmd
http://www.lapdonline.org/newton_community_police_station

Parks in Los Angeles
Regional parks in California